Domingo Valderrama y Centeno (died 1615) was a Roman Catholic prelate who served as Archbishop of La Paz (1608–1615) and Archbishop of Santo Domingo (1606–1608).

Biography
Domingo Valderrama y Centeno  was ordained a priest in the Order of Preachers.
On 25 September 1606, he was selected by the King of Spain and confirmed by Pope Paul V as Archbishop of Santo Domingo.  In 1607, he was consecrated bishop. On 28 May 1608, he was appointed by Pope Paul V as Archbishop (personal title) of La Paz where he served until his death in 1615.

References

External links and additional sources
 (for Chronology of Bishops) 
 (for Chronology of Bishops) 
 (for Chronology of Bishops) 
 (for Chronology of Bishops) 

1615 deaths
17th-century Roman Catholic archbishops in the Dominican Republic
17th-century Roman Catholic archbishops in Bolivia
Bishops appointed by Pope Paul V
Dominican bishops
Roman Catholic archbishops of La Paz
Roman Catholic archbishops of Santo Domingo
Roman Catholic bishops of La Paz